Rasmus Nørby  (born 10 September 1982) is a former tennis player from Denmark.

Tennis career
Nørby made his debut for the Danish Davis Cup team in 2003 against Tunisia and played in ten Davis Cup ties. During his Davis Cup career, he won 6 of the 8 singles matches and 4 of the 6 doubles matches that he played.

Nørby mainly participated on the ATP Challenger Tour and the Futures circuit. He achieved most of his success as a doubles player and won 2 Challenger titles and 14 Futures titles. He also won one singles title on the Futures circuit.

ATP Challenger and ITF Futures titles

Singles: 1 
{|
|-valign=top
|

Doubles: 16 
{|
|-valign=top
|

See also
List of Denmark Davis Cup team representatives

References

External links
 
 

1982 births
Living people
Danish male tennis players
People from Hjørring
Sportspeople from the North Jutland Region
21st-century Danish people